Saint Sergius of Valaam was a Greek monk and wonderworker credited with bringing Orthodox Christianity to Karelian and Finnish people. Conflicting church traditions place him possibly as early as the 10th century or as late as the 14th. His feast day is celebrated on June 28.

Church legends about St. Sergius of Valaam were not committed to writing until the 18th century. In these writings, Sergius is described as an Athonite monk sent by the Byzantine Emperor to enlighten the heathen tribes of Karelia with the light of the Christian faith. He traveled along the trade route from the Varangians to the Greeks, passing the Rus' towns of Kiev, Novgorod and Staraya Ladoga. He arrived on the northern shores of Lake Ladoga, and soon moved to Valaam island, where he would spend the rest of his life preaching.

A tradition placing his arrival on Valaam as early as 992 would make him a contemporary of Emperor Basil II. Another pious legend describes Sergius as a disciple of Apostle Andrew who reportedly visited Crimea in the 1st century AD. However, the earliest record of this saint's activity claims that he arrived in Valaam in 1329. His work was carried on by, among others, Herman of Valaam, who may or may not have a contemporary of Sergius. Saints Sergius and Herman are considered the founders of the Valaam Monastery. Yet another church tradition dates his death to 1353, but there are no medieval documents to validate this claim either. The archaeological record places the arrival of Christianity in Finland at the 10th or 11th centuries.

The date of the monastery's foundation is not clear, as all records of its early history have been destroyed, most of them in the Russo-Swedish Wars. According to an 18th-century church chronicle, the relics of Sergius and Herman were moved to safety in Novgorod in 1162 (or 1163), possibly before a major Swedish offensive against Staraya Ladoga, roughly a decade after the legendary First Swedish Crusade, to be returned in 1182 (or 1180). The date of the translation, September 11, continues to be commemorated by the Orthodox Church of Finland.

See also 
 Stephen of Perm
 Herman of Alaska

Notes

References 
 Valaam Monastery: Cloister history
 Saints Sergius and Herman of Valaam / Ortodoksi.net
 Sergei ja Herman Valamolainen / Ortodoksi.net / in Finnish (icon)

14th-century Christian saints
Burials at Valaam Monastery
Christian missionaries in Finland
Eastern Orthodox missionaries
Greek Christian monks
Greek Christian missionaries
Saints of medieval Greece
Russian Orthodox monks
Miracle workers
Year of birth unknown
14th-century Byzantine monks
Greek expatriates in Russia
Greek expatriates in Finland